The Tianjin Conservatory of Music is a university in Tianjin, China, under the municipal government. It was founded in 1958 as one of nine conservatories of music in China.

Notable alumni
 Shi Guangnan, composer (1940-1990)
 Jie Ma, pipa musician now based in the US

References

External links
 Official website

 
Universities and colleges in Tianjin
Music schools in China